WXKO (1150 AM) is a radio station broadcasting a sports format. Licensed to Fort Valley, Georgia, United States, the station is owned by Bill Shanks, through licensee Shanks Broadcasting, LLC.

History
On June 1, 2016, WXKO changed their format to sports, with programming from ESPN Radio.

References

External links

XKO
Sports radio stations in the United States
Radio stations established in 1951
1951 establishments in Georgia (U.S. state)